ZTA may refer to:

 The IATA airport code for Tureia Airport in French Polynesia
 Zeta Tau Alpha, an American collegiate sorority
 Zirconia Toughened Alumina
 Zero Trust Architecture
 BZLF1, also known as Zta or EB1, a viral gene of the Epstein–Barr virus